Colegio Simón Bolívar (CSB) is a private school in Colonia Insurgentes, Mixcoac, Benito Juárez, Mexico City. It serves kindergarten through senior high school (preparatoria). It is affiliated with Simón Bolívar University (USB).

References

External links
 Colegio Simón Bolívar 

High schools in Mexico City